Patrícia Hmírová (born 30 November 1993) is a Slovak professional footballer who plays as a forward for Spanish Primera División club Sporting de Huelva and the Slovakia women's national team.

Club career
Hmírová played in the Slovak Women's First League for ŠKF Žilina before moving to the Polish Ekstraliga where she played for 1.FC azs awf Katowice, TS Mitech Żywiec and Górnik Łęczna.

In 2017, she joined Czarni Sosnowiec in the Poland Ekstraliga Kobiet.

International career
Hmírová is also a member of the Slovakia women's national football team.

References

External links
 

1993 births
Living people
Slovak women's footballers
Women's association football forwards
Slovakia women's international footballers
TS Mitech Żywiec players
Górnik Łęczna (women) players
FC Neunkirch players
KKS Czarni Sosnowiec players
Sporting de Huelva players
Slovak expatriate footballers
Slovak expatriate sportspeople in Switzerland
Expatriate women's footballers in Switzerland
Slovak expatriate sportspeople in Poland
Expatriate women's footballers in Poland
Slovak expatriate sportspeople in Spain
Expatriate women's footballers in Spain
FIFA Century Club